The White Sewing Machine was the first sewing machine from the White Sewing Machine Company. It used a vibrating shuttle bobbin driver design. For that reason, and to differentiate it from the later White Family Rotary that used a rotary hook design instead, it came to be known as the "White Vibrating Shuttle" or "White VS".  In 1879 it cost USD50 to US$125 (US$1097 to US$2744 adjusted) depending on which table or cabinet it was to be mounted in. The White VS continued in production, with improvements, until the early 1900s.

There was also a 3/4-sized version called the "White Peerless".

Production

Versions 

The White VS evolved over time through these versions:

Portable versions 

White developed a 3/4-sized version for the sake of portability, exactly as Singer was developing the 3/4-sized model VS-3/28/128. It was called the 'Peerless' and its evolution tracked that of its full-sized parent:

Shuttle changes 

The first versions of the White Sewing Machine  used a "boat" shuttle that was comparable to those used in contemporary transverse shuttle machines. In 1886 the shuttle was changed to a bullet shape, with a thin rod in the interior upon which the bobbin rotates. The change was probably prompted by the bullet shuttle used in the new Singer Vibrating Shuttle machine, invented the year before, itself a derivative of the White machine.  Still later, the shuttle was refined again for the Peerless machines.

Badged variants

White produced VS machines under several different badges, in addition to the Peerless.  These included 'Franklin' (same name as a Singer model 27 clone produced later), 'Mason D', 'Minnesota E', and 'Queen'.

History 

D'Arcy Porter and George W. Baker designed the machine and are named as inventors on most of the six original US patents, dated 1876–1877, that cover it. The company literature would later look back adoringly on them, calling them "two of [White's] best mechanics" who had "perfected a new type of sewing machine, far superior to anything then on the market".

At the time of its development, the machine was the White Sewing Machine Company's flagship product—so much so that it was simply named the "White Sewing Machine".  Only later it was called the "White Vibrating Shuttle", when a rotary hook model named the White Family Rotary was added to the product line.

References

External links 

Sewing machines